Madeleine Chapsal (born 1 September 1925, Paris, France) is a French author and the daughter of Robert Chapsal, son of the politician Fernand Chapsal, and of Marcelle Chaumont, who made dresses for Madeleine Vionnet. She married the French journalist and politician Jean-Jacques Servan-Schreiber in 1947 with whom she participated to the creation the news magazine L'Express. She was a member of the Prix Femina jury between 1981 and 2006.

Bibliography

Novels 
 1973 : Un été sans histoire 
 1974 : Je m'amuse et je t'aime
 1976 : Grands cris dans la nuit du couple
 1979 : Une femme en exil 
 1980 : Un homme infidèle
 1986 : La maison de jade
 1987 : Adieu l'amour 
 1988 : Douleur d'août and Une saison de feuilles
 1990 : Le retour du bonheur and Si aimée si seule'
 1991 : On attend les enfants and "La chair de la robe"
 1992 : La femme abandonnée and Mère et filles 1993 : Suzanne et la province 1994 : L'Inventaire 1995 : Une femme heureuse 1996 : Le foulard bleu and Reviens Simone 1997 : Un été sans toi, Un bouquet de violettes, La maîtresse de mon mari and Les amoureux 1998 : Cet homme est marié, La mieux aimée and Défense d'aimer 
 1999 : L'Embellisseur, L'indivision and Meurtre en Thalasso 2000 : Dans la tempête, Divine passion, J'ai toujours raison, Jeu de femme and Nos jours heureux 2001 : Deux femmes en vue, La Femme sans, La Maison and Les chiffons du rêve 2002 : L'amour n'a pas de saison and Nos enfants si gâtés 2003 : La Ronde des âges 2005 : Un oncle à héritage and Les roses de Bagatelle 2006 : Le Charme des liaisons and Affaires de cœur 
 2007 : Un amour pour trois, La Femme à l'écharpe and Il vint m'ouvrir la porte 2008 : C'est tout un roman, Une balle près de cœur and Méfiez-vous des jeunes filles 2009 : Le Bonheur dans le mariage 2010 : Madeleine Vionnet ma mère et moi: L'éblouissement de la haute couture 2010 : A qui tu penses quand tu me fais l'amour ? 2011 : Deux sœurs and La Mort rôde Essays 
 1960 : Vérités sur les jeunes filles and Les Écrivains en personne 1963 : Quinze écrivains : entretiens 1970 : Les professeurs pour quoi faire ?, with Michèle Manceaux
 1977 : La Jalousie 1984 : Envoyez la petite musique 
 1986 : L'Élégance des années 50 1989 : La chair de la robe 1990 : Le Retour du bonheur 1991 : L'Ami chien 1993 : Oser écrire 1994 : Ce que m'a appris Françoise Dolto and L'Inondation 1995 : Une soudaine solitude 1996 : La femme en moi 1997 : Ils l'ont tuée and Les Amis de passage 1998 : Les Plus belles lettres d'amour 1999 : Si je vous dis le mot passion et Trous de mémoire 2002 : Callas l'extrême and Conversations impudiques 2003 : Dans mon jardin and Mes éphémères 2005 : Le Certain âge 2007 : Apprendre à aimer 2009 : Madeleine Vionnet Testimonies 
 2002 : Conversations impudiques, with Edouard Servan-Schreiber
 2004 : L'Homme de ma vie and Noces avec la vie 2006 : Journal d'hier et d'aujourd'hui 2007 : L'Exclusion 2008 : Journal d'hier et d'aujourd'hui II 2009 : Journal d'hier et d'aujourd'hui III 2011 : Ces voix que j'entends encore 2012 : David  Children books 
 1971 : Alphabêtes, Les Éléphants magiques, La Fleur du soleil, Le Poisson voyageur and Hop la ! dans un ciel de printemps 1972 : Mimichat, Nourson and Le Chien jaune 1973 : Un anniversaire chez les dragons 
 1978 : Attention au loup ! 2009 : Bzzi-Bzzi vole dans la prairie Theater 
 1985 : Un flingue sous les roses 
 1989 : Quelques pas sur la terre 1998 : Combien de femmes pour faire un homme ? and En scène pour l'entracte Poetry 
 1981 : Divine passion 1996 : Paroles amoureuses Audiobook
 1986 : La Maison de Jade, read by the author

 Documentaries 
 1961 : Le Temps du ghetto by Frédéric Rossif
 1963 : Mourir à Madrid by Frédéric Rossif
 1967 : Révolution d'octobre by Frédéric Rossif
 1976 : La Fête sauvage by Frédéric Rossif
 1991 : Les Animaux by Frédéric Rossif

 Film adaptations 
 1982 : Une autre femme by Hélène Misserly
 1988 : La Maison de Jade by Nadine Trintignant
 1989 : Une saison de feuilles by Serge Leroy
 1992 : La Femme abandonnée by Édouard Molinaro
 1996 : La Dernière fête by Pierre Granier-Deferre
 1998 : L'Inventaire'' by Caroline Huppert

Awards 
 "Officier de la Légion d'honneur"
 "Grand croix de l'ordre national du Mérite" (la décoration lui a été remise à l'Élysée le 28 septembre 2011 en présence notamment de Liliane Bettencourt)

References

External links 
 

1925 births
Living people
Writers from Paris
20th-century French novelists
21st-century French novelists